Antonio M. Fletcher is a United States Army lieutenant general who serves as commander of the NATO Special Operations Headquarters since October 15, 2021. He most recently served as the Deputy Director of the Defense Threat Reduction Agency from August 2020 to September 2021. Previously, he served as the Commander of Special Operations Command South from June 5, 2018, to July 24, 2020.

In July 2021, he was nominated for promotion to lieutenant general, replacing Mark C. Schwartz as the nominee for the commander of the NATO Special Operations Headquarters. He was promoted to his present rank on October 15, 2021.

References

Living people
Place of birth missing (living people)
Recipients of the Distinguished Service Medal (US Army)
Recipients of the Legion of Merit
United States Army generals
United States Army personnel of the Gulf War
United States Army personnel of the War in Afghanistan (2001–2021)
Year of birth missing (living people)